Coniocleonus is a genus of beetles belonging to the family Curculionidae.

The genus was first described by Motschulsky in 1860.

The species of this genus are found in Europe.

Species:
 Coniocleonus hollbergii
 Coniocleonus nebulosus
 Coniocleonus turbatus

References

Curculionidae
Curculionidae genera